6th NYFCCO Awards
December 11, 2006

Best Film: 
 The Queen 
The 6th New York Film Critics Online Awards, honoring the best in filmmaking in 2006, were given on 11 December 2006.

Top 10 Films
(in alphabetical order)
Babel
The Fountain
Inland Empire
Pan's Labyrinth (El laberinto del fauno)
Little Children
Little Miss Sunshine
The Queen
Thank You for Smoking
Volver
Water

Winners
Best Actor:
Forest Whitaker - The Last King of Scotland as Idi Amin
Best Actress:
Helen Mirren - The Queen as Elizabeth II
Best Animated Film:
Happy Feet
Best Cast:
Little Miss Sunshine
Best Cinematography:
The Illusionist - Dick Pope
Best Debut Director:
Jonathan Dayton and Valerie Faris - Little Miss Sunshine
Best Director:
Stephen Frears - The Queen
Best Documentary Film:
An Inconvenient Truth
Best Film:
The Queen
Best Film Score:
The Illusionist - Philip Glass
Best Foreign Language Film:
Pan's Labyrinth (El laberinto del fauno) • Mexico
Best Screenplay:
The Queen - Peter Morgan
Best Supporting Actor:
Michael Sheen - The Queen as Tony Blair
Best Supporting Actress: (tie)
Jennifer Hudson - Dreamgirls as Effie White
Catherine O'Hara - For Your Consideration as Marilyn Hack
Breakthrough Performer:
Jennifer Hudson - Dreamgirls

References

New York Film Critics Online Awards
2006 film awards
2006 in American cinema